Pouteria sagotiana is a species of plant in the family Sapotaceae. It is found in Brazil, French Guiana, Guyana, and Suriname.

References

sagotiana
Least concern plants
Taxonomy articles created by Polbot
Taxa named by Henri Ernest Baillon
Taxa named by Pierre Joseph Eyma